The Parco di Monza Challenge was a golf tournament on the Challenge Tour that was played in 2006 at Golf Club Milano in Monza near Milan, Italy. It was won by Spain's Álvaro Salto.

Winners

References

External links
Coverage on the Challenge Tour's official site

Former Challenge Tour events
Golf tournaments in Italy